Eoophyla excentrica is a moth in the family Crambidae. It was described by Wolfram Mey and Wolfgang Speidel in 1999. It is found in Yemen, Saudi Arabia, Ethiopia, Kenya, Tanzania and Uganda.

The wingspan is 15–22 mm. The forewings are whitish, the costa suffused with brown in the basal half. There is a yellow arc enclosing a silver-grey dorsal wedge. The base of the hindwings is whitish with a brown spot and a yellow central band. Adults have been recorded on wing in February, April, May, July, August, November and December.

References

Eoophyla
Moths described in 1999